Don't, Dont, or DONT may refer to:

Films
 Don't (1925 film), a 1925 silent comedy film
 Don't (1974 film), a 1974 film about the monarch butterfly
 Don't, a fake trailer from the film Grindhouse (2007)

Songs
 "Don't" (Billy Currington song)
 "Don't" (Bryson Tiller song)
"Don't", by Dinosaur Jr. from their album Bug, 1988
 "Don't" (Ed Sheeran song)
 "Don't" (Elvis Presley song)
 "Don't!", a song by Shania Twain
 "Don't", by M2M from their album The Big Room

Other uses
 Don't (game show), a 2020 American game show with Adam Scott and Ryan Reynolds
 DONT, Disturb Opponents' Notrump, a bridge bidding convention
 "-dont" (actually "-odont"), a suffix meaning "tooth", used in taxonomy
 Jakob Dont, Austrian composer

See also
 Contraction (grammar)
 Do (verb)